Thorvald Astrup (18 May 1876 – 12 August 1940) was a Norwegian architect, particularly known for industrial architecture.
 
He was born in Kristiania (now Oslo), Norway.  He was the son of city captain  Harald Astrup and Johanne Emilie Smith. He was a brother of Arctic explorer Eivind Astrup (1871–1895), merchant Sigurd Astrup (1873–1949) and architect Henning Astrup (1864–1896).
His sister Hanna (1869–1933) was married to politician Peter Andreas Morell.

He was educated at Kristiania Technical School in 1891-92 and Kristiania Fine Art School the following year. He also attended Technische Hochschule Charlottenburg from 1896 to 1897. In 1899 he started to work as an architect with  Henrik Nissen and Henrik Bull. In 1901, he opened architectural practice in Kristiania. From 1934, he worked together with his son, architect Henning Thorvaldsson Astrup (1904–83), under the company name Thorvald and Henning Astrup.

Astrup specializing in industrial constructions, particularly related to power production and transmission, factories and dams; many monumental installations were built in neoclassical or functionalistic style. These include Såheim Power Station in Rjukan (1916), Tyssedal Power Station (1906), while the administration building for Norsk Hydro in Rjukan is built in jugendstil  style.  His neoclassical buildings  included the  Soria Moria cinema in Oslo (1928). Astrup also designed all the railway stations on the Tinnoset Line and Rjukan Line.

Gallery

References 

1876 births
1940 deaths
Architects from Oslo
Technical University of Berlin alumni
Norsk Hydro people
Art Nouveau architects
Burials at the Cemetery of Our Saviour